Simione Tamanisau (born 5 June 1982) is a Fijian international footballer, who plays as a goalkeeper and striker for Suva in the National Football League.

Club career
Tamanisau has spent his entire domestic career so far in his native Fiji. During the 2010–11 season, Tamanisau had a loan spell in Papua New Guinea with Hekari United.

He is mostly used as a goalkeeper but able to play as a striker when needed. On 19 October 2016, he scored the winning goal for Rewa in their 2–1 victory against Suva in the National Football League match.

International career
Tamanisau earned his first call-up to the Fiji national football team in 2003, during his inaugural season. He won five caps that year. The following year, he played in his first FIFA World Cup qualifying match when he kept goal in the 4–2 victory over Papua New Guinea on 12 May 2004. He played another five matches in the qualification campaign for the 2006 World Cup, conceding 11 goals in total. He made a further two appearances for the team in 2005, and the team did not play during 2006.

During qualification for the 2010 World Cup in South Africa, Tamanisau became embroiled in controversy when he was denied entry to New Zealand to play a Second Qualifying Round tie. He was stopped at customs because his father-in-law, a military police officer, had been involved in the 2006 Fijian coup d'état. The match was eventually postponed with Fiji refusing to play without their first-choice goalkeeper. On 19 November 2008, the game was played with Fiji emerging 2–0 winners. Following this match, Tamanisau spent over two years out of the Fiji team before returning to make seven more appearances for his country during 2011.

On 16 July 2016, Tamanisau was selected by the Fiji under-23 team for the 2016 Summer Olympics as one of three overage players.

In 2019, he was selected for the 2019 Pacific Games. Fiji won a bronze medal.

International career statistics

References

External links

Record at FIFA Tournaments – FIFA

1982 births
Living people
Fijian footballers
Fiji international footballers
Association football goalkeepers
Navua F.C. players
Rewa F.C. players
People from Tailevu Province
Lautoka F.C. players
Hekari United players
2004 OFC Nations Cup players
2008 OFC Nations Cup players
2012 OFC Nations Cup players
2016 OFC Nations Cup players
Footballers at the 2016 Summer Olympics
Olympic footballers of Fiji